The Debus–Radziszewski imidazole synthesis is an organic reaction used for the synthesis of imidazoles from a dicarbonyl, an aldehyde, and ammonia.  The dicarbonyl component is commonly glyoxal, but can also include various 1,2-diketones and ketoaldehydes.  The method is used commercially to produce several imidazoles.  The process is an example of a multicomponent reaction.

The reaction can be viewed as occurring in two stages.  In the first stage, the dicarbonyl and ammonia condense to give a diimine (shown with unusual orientation of N-H groups):

In the second stage, this diimine condenses with the aldehyde:

This reaction is named after Heinrich Debus and Bronisław Leonard Radziszewski.

A modification of this general method, where one equivalent of ammonia is replaced by an amine, affords N-substituted imidazoles in good yields.

References

Nitrogen heterocycle forming reactions
Name reactions